Dorfschwalben aus Österreich (Village Swallows from Austria), Op. 164, is a Viennese waltz composed by Josef Strauss in 1864 or 1865.

It was inspired by August Silberstein's novel Dorfschwalben aus Österreich. It was premiered at the Volksgarten, Vienna, on September 6, 1864 (1865?). The polka-mazurka "Frauenherz" was premiered at the same time. Both compositions were played during Josef Strauss's memorial ceremony under the direction of his brother, Johann Strauss II.

Structure

Introduction.

Waltz 1

Waltz 2

Waltz 3

Waltz 4

Waltz 5

Coda

Vienna New Year's Concert 
It was played the Vienna New Year's Concert in these years:
1947 – Josef Krips 
1956 – Willi Boskovsky 
1963 – Willi Boskovsky
1977 – Willi Boskovsky
1986 – Lorin Maazel
1992 – Carlos Kleiber
2001 – Nikolaus Harnoncourt
2008 – Georges Prêtre
2015 – Zubin Mehta

References

External links 

Compositions by Josef Strauss
Waltzes
1864 compositions